The Old Croton Dam is a historic dam located in Yorktown, Westchester County, New York, now lying submerged beneath the waters of the New Croton Reservoir. The dam was built on the Croton River between 1837 and 1842, and was the first substantial masonry dam in the United States. Construction was delayed by a January 1841 storm that washed away most of the dam, with heavy downstream damage and loss of life.

History
The gravity dam was constructed with a rubble core and granite ashlar foundation. The dam impounded water from the Croton River watershed, forming a reservoir several miles long to the northeast along the path of the Croton River. Water flowed to New York City through the Old Croton Aqueduct, which started just upstream of the dam, carrying water down the Croton River valley toward the Hudson River, then roughly following the Hudson south.  

The dam and aqueduct constituted a major part of the original New York City water supply system. The New Croton Aqueduct opened in 1890, augmenting the original system until supply from the Delaware and Catskill aqueducts was sufficient to take it offline in 1955.

The dam site was added to the National Register of Historic Places in 1973.

See also
National Register of Historic Places listings in northern Westchester County, New York

References

Buildings and structures in Westchester County, New York
Dams completed in 1842
Water infrastructure of New York City
Water supply infrastructure on the National Register of Historic Places
Dams on the National Register of Historic Places in New York (state)
National Register of Historic Places in Westchester County, New York
Yorktown, New York